Sobhan Khaghani (born 27 January 2000) is an Iranian footballer who plays for Iranian club Esteghlal as a winger.

Club career

Esteghlal
He joined Esteghlal in the Summer of 2020. He scored his first goal for the club on his first start against Shahr Khodro on 13 December 2020. On 20 July 2021 he scored his second goal for the club against Naft Masjed Soleyman F.C. This goal is 900th goal in the Esteghlal history.

Personal life 
He was born with only one kidney, but he doesn’t have a problem to play.

Honours

Esteghlal 
Iran Pro League: 2021–22
Hazfi Cup runner-up: 2020–21
Iranian Super Cup:  2022

References

2000 births
Living people
Iranian footballers
Persian Gulf Pro League players
Association football midfielders
Iran youth international footballers
Tractor S.C. players
Esteghlal F.C. players